In basketball, a flop is an intentional fall or stagger by a player after little or no physical contact by an opposing player in order to draw a personal foul call by an official against the opponent. The move is sometimes called acting, as in "acting as if he was fouled". Because it is inherently designed to deceive the official, flopping is generally considered to be unsportsmanlike. Nonetheless, it is widely practiced and even perfected by many professional players.  The player that commits the act is referred to as a flopper.

Flopping effectively is not easy to do, primarily because drawing contact can sometimes result in the opposite effect—a foul called on the defensive player—when too much contact is drawn or if the player has not positioned himself perfectly. Additionally, even if no foul is called on either player, by falling to the floor, the flopping defensive player will have taken himself out of position to provide any further defensive opposition on the play, thus potentially allowing the offense to score easily. To consistently draw offensive fouls on opponents takes good body control and a great deal of practice.

The National Basketball Association (NBA) added a rule in 1997 to cut down on flopping in the key 'paint' near the basket, adding a 4-foot (1.22 meter) restricted arc (noted with a dashed circle) around the center of the basket to help prevent flops. Such flops are charged as blocking fouls or no-calls, or goaltending if done above the rim. In the 2012–13 season, the league began fining guilty players.

In the NBA, the penalty for "flopping" is a technical foul if caught in-game, and a fine if caught after the game in video reviews.  The technical foul is a non-unsportsmanlike conduct technical foul (one of six fouls a player may be assessed before disqualification;  no ejection is possible). In FIBA play, the penalty is a technical foul that counts as one of two towards ejection.

National Federation of State High School Associations basketball rule 10.6.f of 2012–13 specifically defines "faking being fouled", in the judgment of an official, as unsportsmanlike conduct subject to penalty of a technical foul, but in practice without any in-game access to replay video, this call is exceptionally rare.

NBA
The NBA regulated flopping starting in the 2012–13 season. Any player who flops during the regular season would first be warned, followed by fines in increments of $5,000 for each successive flop during the season. The fines would increase to $30,000 for a fifth offense, when a suspension would also be considered. In the playoffs, players are fined $5,000 for their first flopping offense, $10,000 for a second, $15,000 for a third, and $30,000 for a fourth. Any player who flops five or more times could be suspended.

History
Frank Ramsey, who played on seven championship teams for the Boston Celtics from 1954 to 1965, wrote a cover story in Sports Illustrated in 1963 with writer Frank Deford, where he detailed his flopping technique. Afterwards, Ramsey was reprimanded in a letter by NBA president Walter Kennedy. In the 1970s, Ramsey's coach, Red Auerbach, criticized flopping in one of his "Red on Roundball" segments at halftime during NBA game telecasts.

On May 28, 2008, the NBA announced that it would impose fines on players who show a clear case of flopping and suspensions for repeat offenders. However, the league did not impose any fines, but continued to monitor the situation.

NBA player Rasheed Wallace has been critical of flopping in the league. In a 2008 interview, when he was with the Detroit Pistons, he complained that:

On November 28, 2009, Wallace, by this time with the Boston Celtics, again made sports news wires when he claimed that Hedo Türkoğlu, then with the Toronto Raptors, duped the officials into giving Wallace his fifth technical of the season by flopping:

Commissioner David Stern complained about flopping as offensive against the game's officials, but the league has been unable to find a way to punish it or prevent it.  And, although Stern agreed with Wallace in principle, the league fined Wallace $25,000. for the 2008 outburst (because of the obscenities) and $30,000 for the second.

Shaquille O'Neal loathes opponents who resort to flopping.  He criticized Dikembe Mutombo, the 2000–2001 Defensive Player of the Year, in the 2001 NBA Finals and Vlade Divac in the 2002 Western Conference finals for their theatrics. O'Neal said he would never exaggerate contact to draw a foul. "I'm a guy with no talent who has gotten this way with hard work."  In a 2006 interview in Time, O'Neal said if he were NBA commissioner, he would "Make a guy have to beat a guy--not flop and get calls and be nice to the referees and kiss ass." However, in a matchup against the Orlando Magic on March 3, 2009, O'Neal flopped against center Dwight Howard. Magic coach Stan Van Gundy was "very disappointed cause [O'Neal] knows what it's like. Let's stand up and play like men, and I think our guy did that tonight."  O'Neal responded, "Flopping is playing like that your whole career. I was trying to take the charge, trying to get a call. It probably was a flop, but flopping is the wrong use of words. Flopping would describe his coaching."

Shortly before the Indiana Pacers were to take on the Miami Heat in the 2012 Eastern Conference semifinals, Pacers head coach Frank Vogel criticized his opponents for alleged flopping:
 Vogel was fined $15,000 by the league for these remarks.

In May 2012, Commissioner David Stern reiterated that flopping is a legitimate concern. Fines for flopping were introduced the following season. On November 21, 2012, Brooklyn Nets forward Reggie Evans became the first NBA player to be fined for flopping. After having been warned for a previous offense, the NBA league office identified an instance of flopping on Evans in the Nets' loss to the Los Angeles Lakers on November 20, 2012. Evans was fined $5,000. The rate of violations slowed as the season progressed, an indication that players realized the rule was being enforced. There were 24 violations during that regular season, with five players receiving the $5,000 fine for a second offense.

In the 2013 Eastern Conference semifinals between the Chicago Bulls and the Miami Heat, Bulls head coach Tom Thibodeau accused LeBron James of flopping. James vehemently denied the accusation, saying "I don't need to flop. I play an aggressive game but I don't flop. I've never been one of those guys. I don't need to flop. I don't even know how to do it. So it doesn't mean much to me." Thibodeau was fined $35,000 by the league for his comments. Nonetheless, James was seen winking after a flop in Game 5 of the Eastern Conference semifinals in 2011. On May 29, 2013 before Game 4 of the Eastern Conference Finals against Indiana Pacers, James again denied that he is a flopper, but said that he recognizes flopping as an effective strategy. "Some guys have been [flopping] for years, just trying to get an advantage. Any way you can get an advantage over the opponent to help your team win, so be it," James said.

As of June 14, 2013, eight players had been fined for flopping during the playoffs: Pacers' Jeff Pendergraph, Thunder's Derek Fisher, Knicks' J. R. Smith, Grizzlies' Tony Allen, Heat's LeBron James and Chris Bosh, Pacers' David West and Lance Stephenson. Stern said that the amounts of the fines were insufficient "when the average player's salary is $5.5 million. And anyone who thought that was going to happen was allowing hope to prevail over reason."

On June 7, 2013, Dallas Mavericks owner Mark Cuban announced that he is funding a study on flopping. One of Cuban's companies, Radical Hoops Ltd., has provided $100,000 to have biomechanics experts from Southern Methodist University launch an 18-month study into the forces involved in collisions during basketball plays. The goal is to investigate the possibility of using video or motion capture techniques to distinguish between legitimate collision and flop. The Mavericks' Dirk Nowitzki did not believe that flops were a problem if a player was pushed and tried "sell it a little" to get a favorable call from referees.

See also
 Diving (association football)
 Diving (ice hockey)

References

External links
 ESPN's Page 2 on "The Art of Flopping" The article includes the columnist's opinions about who are the best (i.e. most egregious) floppers.
 This American Life "Crybabies", Act Two chronicles the phenomenon of basketball flopping and its origins.

Basketball terminology
Basketball penalties